The year 1987 in television involved some significant events. This is a list of notable events in the United States.

Events

Programs

Debuting this year

Resuming this year

Ending this year

Changing networks

Made-for-TV movies and miniseries

Television stations

Station launches

Network affiliation changes

Births

Deaths

Television Debuts
Patricia Arquette – Daddy
Billy Crudup – General College
Chris Elliott – Miami Vice
Juliette Lewis – Home Fires
Brad Pitt – Another World
Joely Richardson – Kin of the Castle
Chris Rock – Miami Vice

See also
 1987 in the United States
 List of American films of 1987

References

External links
List of 1987 American television series at IMDb

 
1980s in American television